Division 2 Sydsvenska Serien 1923–24 was part of the 1923–24 Swedish football season.

League table

References
 

1923 in association football
1924 in association football